Warner Bros. Discovery Americas is a company managing a collection of pay television networks and other services in Latin America. 

The company was created in April 2022, bringing together WarnerMedia Latin America (founded in 1993 as Turner Broadcasting System Latin America), and Discovery Latin America (founded on August 1, 1994).

Operating channels

Pan-Latin America

Kids & Family 
 Cartoon Network
 Cartoonito
 Discovery Kids
 Tooncast

Entertainment Group 
 TNT
 TBS
 TruTV
 TCM
 Investigation Discovery
 TNT Series
 I-SAT
 Space
 HTV
 MuchMusic
 Glitz
 Warner TV

Factual & Lifestyle Group 
 Discovery Channel
 Animal Planet
 Food Network
 HGTV
 TLC
 Discovery Science
 Discovery Home & Health
 Discovery Turbo
 Discovery World
 Discovery Theater

HBO Latin America Group 
 HBO (formerly known as HBO Ole)
 HBO2
 HBO+ (formerly known as HBO Ole 2 and HBO Plus)
 HBO Family
 HBO Signature
 HBO Mundi (formerly known as Max)
 HBO Pop (formerly known as Max Up)
 HBO Xtreme (formerly known as Max Prime)
 Cinemax (ad-supported basic cable network since 2009)

Sports 
 TNT Sports
 TNT Sports Argentina
 TNT Sports Brazil (as a brand name)
 TNT Sports Chile
 TNT Sports Mexico (as a brand name)
Golf Channel

News 
 CNN Chile
 CNN en Español

Distribution only 
 CNN International
 HLN
 CNN (USA)

Licensed only 
 CNN Brazil (licensed to Novus Media)
 CNN Radio Argentina (licensed to Argentinos Media)
 CNN Radio Brazil (licensed to Transamérica)

Other assets 
 Raze
 Redknot (joint venture with Nelvana)
 HBO Max
 Discovery+

Argentina 
Imagen Satelital S.A. (formerly Turner Internacional Argentina), is an Argentine commercial broadcasting company headquartered in Buenos Aires. It is a subsidiary of Warner Bros. Discovery Americas. The company was bought by Claxson Interactive Group in 1997, which later sold the group to Turner Broadcasting System in 2007.

Television channels 
 I.Sat
 Space
 HTV
 MuchMusic
 Glitz

Former channels

Closed
 Retro (replaced by TCM or TruTV, depending on the cable provider, on April 1, 2009)
 Infinito (replaced by TNT Series on March 10, 2015)
 Esporte Interativo (closed September 25, 2018, sports rights moved to TNT and Space, branding replaced as TNT Sports on January 8, 2021)
 Discovery Civilization (replaced by HGTV in Brazil on November 5, 2019, and July 2021 in Latin America)
 CDF (replaced by TNT Sports on January 17, 2021)
 Boomerang (replaced by Cartoonito on December 1, 2021)

Divested
 Chilevisión (sold to Paramount Networks Americas in 2021)
 Mega Media (27.5% with Bethia)
 Mega
 Mega 2
 Mega Ficción
 Mega Plus
 ETC
 Particular Crowd (spun-off in 2023)

See also 
 Ole Distribution

References

Warner Bros. Discovery Americas
Warner Bros. Discovery subsidiaries
Mass media companies established in 1993
Mass media companies established in 1994